"Whenever God Shines His Light" is a song written by Northern Irish singer-songwriter Van Morrison and released on his 1989 album Avalon Sunset as a duet with Cliff Richard.  Although the album was released in June 1989, this song was released as a single in November 1989 for the Christmas sales market.   Morrison and Richard performed the duet on the British music chart television show, Top of the Pops.  The single charted at No. 20 on the UK Singles Chart and No. 3 on the Irish Singles Chart. AllMusic critic Jason Ankeny describes it as a "standout opener" to Avalon Sunset. Critic Patrick Humphries describes it as "the most manifest example of Morrison's Christian commitment," claiming that although it "is not one of Morrison's most outstanding songs" it works as "a testament of faith".  Cash Box said that "if George Harrison can have a hit single while invoking his sweet Lord, Van could do it with the totally engaging 'Whenever God Shines His Light.'"

Appearances on other albums
The Best of Van Morrison (1990)
Still on Top – The Greatest Hits (2 disc U.K. edition)
Van Morrison The Concert (1990)

Personnel 

 Van Morrison – vocals, guitar
 Cliff Richard – vocals
 Arty McGlynn – guitar
 Neil Drinkwater – piano
 Steve Pearce – bass guitar
 Roy Jones – drums, percussion
 Dave Early – drums, percussion

Covers
Aled Jones
Waterdeep
Danish Radio Big Band
Marc Roberts

References

Sources
Rogan, Johnny (2006). Van Morrison: No Surrender, London:Vintage Books 

Van Morrison songs
Cliff Richard songs
Male vocal duets
1989 singles
Songs written by Van Morrison
1989 songs
Song recordings produced by Van Morrison